Fedje is the administrative centre of Fedje municipality in Vestland county, Norway.  The village is located on the northern shores of the island of Fedje.  The fishing village is an old trading center, which grew up around Kræmmerholmen, a small island in the Fedje harbor. Fedje Church is located in the village, serving the people of the whole municipality.

References

Villages in Vestland
Fedje